Tonnerre was a  74-gun ship of the line of the French Navy.

Tonnerre′s keel was laid at Brest, France, on 22 July 1794, but she was not launched until 9 June 1808. She was commissioned on 21 July 1808. Under Captain Émile François Guillaume Clément, comte de la Roncière, she joined the Rochefort squadron in February 1809.

By April 1809, Tonnerre was among ships of the French Atlantic Fleet blockaded by British Royal Navy warships at Basque Roads at the mouth of the Charente on the Biscay coast of France. The British attacked on 11 April 1809 with fireships, beginning the lengthy Battle of the Basque Roads, and while adrift during the fireship attack, Tonnerre collided with the grounded flagship of the French fleet, the 120-gun ship of the line , on Océan′s starboard side while Océan′s crew was trying to fend off a fireship that had struck Océan′s stern. Tonnerre inflicted serious damage on Océan, although she quickly detached, allowing Océan′s crew to return their attention to the fireship.

During the night of 11–12 April 1809, Tonnerre went hard aground in Basque Roads near Île Madame at low tide, flooded, and became a wreck. Late on the afternoon of 12 April, about two hours after the British resumed the battle with a bombardment of the French fleet, Tonnerre′s crew set her on fire to prevent her capture by the British and abandoned ship. At 19:30, about two hours after her crew abandoned her, Tonnerre exploded when the flames reached her magazine.

On 21 June 1809, Tonnerre′s commanding officer was court martialed on charges of abandoning his ship too easily and failing to follow orders. He was acquitted of both charges.

References

Footnotes

Sources
 Ships of the line

 Les bâtiments ayant porté le nom de Tonnerre

Ships of the line of the French Navy
Téméraire-class ships of the line
1808 ships
Maritime incidents in 1809
Shipwrecks in the Bay of Biscay
Ship fires
Scuttled vessels